Joe Elliott (born 1959) is lead singer of Def Leppard.

Joe Elliott may also refer to:

Joe Elliott (footballer), English footballer
Julian Elliott (born 1955), known as Joe, academic, psychologist, and principal of Collingwood College, Durham